Bill C. Malone (born August 25, 1934) is an American musician, author and historian specializing in country music and other forms of traditional American music. He is the author of the 1968 book Country Music, U.S.A., the first definitive academic history of country music. Malone is Professor Emeritus of History at Tulane University and now resides in Madison, Wisconsin.

Biography 
Malone was born on a cotton-growing tenant farm 20 miles west of Tyler, Texas in 1934 and grew up with music as "a constant companion".  After studying at community college, he enrolled in the University of Texas in 1956 and became a well-known singer in the Austin area, due in part to his encyclopedic repertoire of "hillbilly" songs he learned growing up.  He performed at Threadgill's beer joint in Austin and completed his Master's degree.  He was pleased when his faculty advisor suggested he write his doctoral dissertation on something he loved: "hillbilly", i.e., country, music.  His 1965 dissertation was published in 1968 as Country Music, U.S.A.

Malone hosts a weekly radio show, Back to the Country, on WORT–FM community radio in Madison, and performs country music with his wife, Bobbie Malone, playing mandolin and guitar.

Honours 
Malone was awarded a Guggenheim Fellowship in 1984 to assist his research in U.S. history.  In 2008, he received a Lifetime Achievement Award from the Society for American Music.

Selected publications 
An early history of Austin, Texas, 1839-1861 (1958) University of Texas, pp. 272,    googlebooks
Country Music, U.S.A. (1968; revised edition 1984; 2nd revised, annotated edition 2002; 3rd revised, annotated edition 2010 with Jocelyn R. Neal) University of Texas Press, pp. 664,  
Southern Music/American Music (co-author with David Stricklin)  (1979;	2nd, illustrated, revised edition 2003) University Press of Kentucky, pp. 236, 
Singing Cowboys and Musical Mountaineers: Southern Culture and the Roots of Country Music (1993) University of Georgia Press, pp. 168, 

Working Girl Blues: The Life and Music of Hazel Dickens (co-author with Hazel Dickens) (2008)  University of Illinois Press, pp. 102, 
Music from the True Vine: Mike Seeger's Life and Musical Journey (2011) UNC Press Books, pp. 240,

References

External links

"Country Music Scholar", October 2005 video interview with Malone in Southern Spaces, published by Emory University Libraries, January 20, 2006. Accessed 2011-09-18.

Living people
1934 births
American music historians
American male non-fiction writers
Musicians from Wisconsin
Musicians from Texas